Pushpaka is a caste of Hindu Brahmins of Kerala. In Malayalam language, this caste is also referred to as Pushpakan, Pushpakar, Pushpaka Unni or Pushpakan Unni.  They are a part of the Ambalavasi community in Kerala. They carry out the various activities of the temple like teaching of sacred texts, assisting in pooja, garland making, lamp bearing, blowing Sankha (conch shell) during puja etc., and sometimes they perform actual priestly activities also. The male members of this caste generally use the surname Unni with their name.  Apart from the prevalent practice of using the title "Unni" as surname, Pushpakas also commonly use other surnames, such as Nambi and Sarma.  Pushpakas are also classified based on their gotra, or patrilineal descent, and the Veda that they follow.  

Pushpaka women are known as Pushpakathi. Pushpaka men are addressed by their surname Unni or Nambi, while pushpaka women are addressed as Atheramma. Pushpaka house is known as Matham (IAST:Maṭham) .

The caste known as Pushpaka are prominent in Southern Kerala and Central Kerala. In Northern Kerala, the Nambeesan caste is referred to as Pushpakas owing to their cultural similarity with Pushpakas in Central and Southern Kerala.

Customs
 Pushpakas are strict vegetarians, and prohibited from drinking spirituous liquor.
 They practice sixteen rituals (Shodasa Samskara) of Hinduism.
 Pushpakas are patrilineal.
 They observe a pollution of 10 days, called Balayma, after a birth in patrilineal line.  After a birth in matrilineal line, Balayma is observed for 3 days. 
 They observe a pollution of 10 days, called Pula, after the death of patrilineal relatives.  After a death in matrilineal line, Pula is observed for 3 days.
 The Suddha-punyaha, i.e., the cleansing ritual after pollution, is performed through the learned men from Pushpaka community or through the agency of Namboothiris.

Temple arts
Pushpakas were traditionally associated with Koodiyattam and Ramanattam.  They also perform certain roles in Krishnanattam.

Comparison with other brahmin castes

  In the wedding rituals (i.e. Vivaha), a Namboothiri bride always wear white dress while the Pushpaka bride will wear coloured dress, preferably red. The auspicious thread which is knotted around the bride's neck is referred to by Pushpakabrahmins as Mangalyasutra (Thali), whereas it is referred to by Namboodiris as Kanthasutra (Thali or Cheruthali). In a Pushpaka marriage, it is the groom who ties it around the bride's neck, whereas in a Namboodiri marriage, it is the bride's father who ties the Kanthasutra to bride's neck.
  Namboothiri women (Antharjanams) were not allowed to wear colored dress. They were supposed to wear only white dress. They were not allowed to pierce nose. Further, a Namboothiri woman was not allowed to look at any man other than her husband, father, grandfather or her brothers on either side. Namboothiri women were not allowed to move out of the house without a maid. These types of restrictions were not generally observed by Pushpaka women (Atherammas).
  They are Ekayajnopavitadharinah, that is, they wear only one "Poonool" (Yajnopaveetham, sacred thread) even after marriage, whereas Paradesi Brahmins wear two sacred threads after marriage, according to their sampradayas.

See also
Pushpaka Brahmins

References

Social groups of Kerala
Malayali Brahmins